The 1998 FIBA Europe Under-20 Championship (known at that time as 1998 European Championship for Men '22 and Under') was the fourth edition of the FIBA Europe Under-20 Championship. The city of Trapani, in Italy, hosted the tournament. Yugoslavia won their first title.

Teams

Squads

Preliminary round
The twelve teams were allocated in two groups of six teams each.

Group A

Group B

Knockout stage

9th–12th playoffs

Championship

5th–8th playoffs

Final standings

Team roster
Milan Dozet, Veselin Petrović, Igor Rakočević, Aleksandar Glintić, Stevan Nađfeji, Jovo Stanojević, Marko Jarić, Dragan Ćeranić, Dejan Milojević, Ratko Varda, and Bojan Obradović.
Head coach: Goran Bojanić.

References
FIBA Archive
FIBA Europe Archive 

FIBA U20 European Championship
1998–99 in European basketball
1998–99 in Italian basketball
International youth basketball competitions hosted by Italy